Ragas & Talas is an album by Hindustani classical musician Ravi Shankar, first released in 1959 by His Master's Voice. It was later digitally remastered and released in CD format through Angel Records.

Track listing
"Rupak Tal" – 5:12
"Raga Madhu-Kauns" – 21:03
"Raga Jogiya" – 16:00
"Dhun" – 10:32

External links
Amazon.com listing

1959 albums
Ravi Shankar albums
Angel Records albums